

Fouesnant (Fouenant or Fouen in Breton) is a commune in the Finistère department of Brittany in north-western France. Fouesnant is bordered to the south by the Baie de La Forêt.

It lies on the south coast of Finistère and is bordered by the communes of: Bénodet and Pleuven to the west, Saint-Évarzec to the north, and La Forêt-Fouesnant to the east. It has 15 km of coastline on its south side, with a long beach running west between the headlands of Beg-Meil and Mousterlin, as well as the idyllic Cap-Coz just to the east at the top of the Baie de la Foret, making it a popular tourist destination.
The town is at the heart of a very fertile area, is well-endowed with orchards and is regarded as the source of the very best Breton cider. Every July this is celebrated with the 'Fete des Pommiers' (Festival of the Apple Trees), an event that takes over the town centre with music, dance and various competitions.
Fouesnant hosts a popular street market in and around the town square every Friday morning.

Population
Inhabitants of Fouesnant are called in French Fouesnantais.

International relations
 Twinned with Meerbusch in Germany

See also
 Glénan islands, administratively part of the commune of Fouesnant
Communes of the Finistère department

References

External links

Official website 

Mayors of Finistère Association 

Communes of Finistère